The Lāmiyyāt al-‘Arab (the L-song of the Arabs) is the pre-eminent poem in the surviving canon of the pre-Islamic 'brigand-poets' (sa'alik). The poem also gained a foremost position in Western views of the Orient from the 1820s onwards. The poem takes its name from the last letter of each of its 68 lines, L (Arabic ل, lām).

The poem is traditionally attributed to the putatively sixth-century CE outlaw (ṣu‘lūk) Al-Shanfarā, but it has been suspected since medieval times that it was actually composed during the Islamic period. For example,  the medieval commentator al-Qālī (d. 969 CE) reported that it was composed by the early anthologist Khalaf al-Aḥmar. The debate has not been resolved; if the poem is a later composition, it figures al-Shanfarā as an archetypal heroic outlaw, an anti-hero nostalgically imagined to expose the corruption of the society that produced him.

Notwithstanding its fame, the poem contains a large number of linguistic obscurities, making it hard to understand in Arabic today, let alone to translate reliably. The major philological study of the work was by Georg Jacob.

Summary

In the words of Warren T. Treadgold,

Shanfarā is being abandoned by his tribe, who have apparently become disgusted with his thievery (1-4). He says he would rather live in exile anyway, for he has a more faithful tribe in the wild beasts of the desert (5-9) and his own resources (10-13). Unlike his sedentary tribe, Shanfarā is unmoved by hardship and danger (14-20). He disdains hunger (21-25), like the gray wolf, whom he describes in an extended simile (36-41). As for thirst, he bears it better even than the desert grouse (36-41). After years of bearing the injustices of war, now he has to bear the pains of exile (44-48). But his endurance is limitless (42-43, 49-53). On the stormiest nights, he raids camps single-handed (54-61); on the hottest days, he goes bareheaded (62-64). Finally, he depicts himself standing on a hilltop after a day of walking across the desert, admired even by the wild goats (65-68).

Example

A good example of the poem's style and tone is provided by distichs 5-7 (3-5 in some editions).

The original text:

Redhouse (1881):
 3. And I have (other) familiars besides you; — a fierce wolf, and a sleek spotted (leopard), and a long-maned hyæna.
 4. They are a family with whom the confided secret is not betrayed; neither is the offender thrust out for that which has happened.
 5. And each one (of them) is vehement in resistance, and brave; only, that I, when the first of the chased beasts present themselves, am (still) braver.

Treadgold (1975):
 I have some nearer kin than you: swift wolf,
 Smooth-coated leopard, jackal with long hair.
 With them, entrusted secrets are not told;
 Thieves are not shunned, whatever they may dare.
 They are all proud and brave, but when we see
 The day's first quarry, I am breaver then.

Stetkevych (1986):
 5. I have closer kin than you: a wolf, swift and sleek,
 a smooth and spotted leopard (smooth speckled snake),
 and a long-maned one—a hyena.
 6. They are kin among whom a secret, once confided, is not revealed;
 nor is the criminal because of his crimes forsaken.
 7. Each one is haughty-proud and reckless-brave,
 except that I, when the first of the prey appear, am braver.

Poem Translation
The following is a poetic translation for the first verses of Lamiyyat al-'Arab

Editions

 Muhammad ibn 'Umar al-Zamakhshari, A'jab  al-'Ajab fi Sharh Lamiyyat al-'Arab, in al-Shanfara, Qasidat Lamiyyat al-'Arab wa yaliha (Istanbul: Matba't al-Jawa'ib, 1300H).
 al-Zamakhsharī, A‘jab al-‘Arab fī Sharḥ Lāmiyyat al-‘Arab (Dār al-Warāqa, 1972) (includes al-Zamakhsharī's commentary, and that attributed to al-Mubarrad)
 al-Mullūhī, al-Lāmiyyatān: Lāmiyyat al-‘Arab, Lāmiyyat al-‘Ajam (Damascus, 1966)
 Badī‘ Sharīf, Lāmiyyat al-‘Arab (Beirut, 1964)

Translations

 A. I. Silvestre de Sacy, Chrestomathie Arabe, 2nd edn, 3 vols (Paris: Imprimerie impériale, 1826), II 134 ff.
 F. Rückert, H.amāsa I (Stuttgart, 1846), pp. 181-85
 
 M. Hillman, 'Lāmīyat al-‘Arab', Literature East and West, 15 (1971). (Prose translation.)
 
 
 Classical Arabic Poetry: 162 Poems from Imrulkais to Ma‘rri, trans. by Charles Greville Tuetey (London: KPI, 1985), pp. 106–7 [no. 10].

References

Medieval Arabic poems